Machuchuta  is a ward in Beitbridge District of Matabeleland South province in southern Zimbabwe.

Wards of Zimbabwe
Beitbridge District